Specimens of Beauty is a documentary about the rock band Phish recording their 2004 album Undermind.  Directed by famed photographer Danny Clinch, the film shows the techniques used by the band and album producer Tchad Blake, as Phish records what was to be their final album.

Recorded at Trey Anastasio's recording studio, The Barn, outside Burlington, Vermont, the documentary features Phish in numerous takes of the Undermind track "Crowd Control."

Specimens of Beauty was included with early copies of Undermind on a bonus DVD.

Personnel
Trey Anastasio - guitars, vocals
Page McConnell - keyboards, vocals
Mike Gordon - bass, vocals
Jon Fishman - drums, vocals

External links 
 

Phish video albums
Rockumentaries
2004 video albums